There is a growing interest in international children's literature, including books in translation. This is recognised in several prizes, including the Marsh Award for Children’s Literature in Translation and the ALSC  Mildred L. Batchelder Award for Children's Books Translated into English. 

 Ruth Ahmedzai Kemp - Russian, German, Arabic to English
 Ajia - English to Chinese
 Sarah Ardizzone – French to English
 Anthea Bell – German to English
 Simon Breden – Spanish to English
 John Brownjohn – German to English
 Karin Chubb – German to English
 Martin Cleaverr – Dutch to English
 Patricia Crampton - German to English
 Howard Curtis – Italian to English
 Lucia Graves – Spanish to English
 Daniel Hahn – Spanish, Portuguese, French to English
 Adriana Hunter – French to English
 Margaret Jull Costa – Basque, Portuguese to English
 Lene Kaaberbol – Danish to English
 Oliver Latsch – German to English
 Sophie Lewis – French to English
 Julia Marshall – Swedish to English
 Nanette McGuinness - Italian, French to English
 George Miller – French to English
 Denise Muir - Italian to English
 John Nieuwenhuizen – Dutch to English
 Frances Østerfelt – Danish to English
 Anna Paterson – Swedish to English
 Guy Puzey - Norwegian to English
 Azita Rassi – Persian to English
 Betsy Rosenberg - Hebrew to English
 Cheryl Robson – Danish to English
 Lance Salway – Dutch to English
 Lawrence Schimel - Spanish to English
 Ros Schwartz – French to English
 Fatima Sharafeddini – Arabic to English
 Ginny Tapley Takemori - Japanese to English
 Laurie Thompson – Swedish to English
 John Thornley – Greek to English
 Avery Fischer Udagawa – Japanese to English
 Helen Wang – Chinese to English
 Rachel Ward - German to English
 Laura Watkinson – Dutch to English
 Siân Williams (translator)  Italian to English
 Chantal Wright – German to English

External links 

Freeman Awards
Global Literature in Libraries
International Board on Books for Young People (IBBY)
Outside In World
Society of Children's Book Writers and Illustrators (SCBWI)
WorldKidLit (blog and resources pages)
World Directory of Children’s Book Translators

See also 

100 Great Children's Books in Translation - by Marcia Lynx Qualey (2016)
100 More Translated Children’s Books from Around the World - by Avery Fischer Udagawa (2017)
Riveting Reads - A World of Books in Translation - Joy Court and Daniel Hahn· (2017)
New in 2017-18: Children’s Books Translated into English - by Ruth Ahmedzai Kemp (2018)
The Translation of Children's Literature: A Reader - by Gillian Lathey (2006)

References 

Literary translators
translators of children's books
Children's books
Children's literature
Translation-related lists